Skeiða- og Gnúpverjahreppur is a small municipality in south-central Iceland.

References

External links
Official website 

Municipalities of Iceland